Idiosoma clypeatum is a trapdoor spider in the Arbanitinae subfamily of the Idiopidae family.  It was first described in 2018 by Michael G. Rix, Mark Harvey and others. 

It is found in the Murchison and Yalgoo IBRA regions of Western Australia.

References

Idiopidae
Spiders of Australia
Fauna of Western Australia
Spiders described in 2018
Taxa named by Michael G. Rix